Gavin Lambert (23 July 1924 – 17 July 2005) was a British-born screenwriter, novelist and biographer who lived for part of his life in Hollywood. His writing was mainly fiction and nonfiction about the film industry.

Personal life
Lambert was educated at Cheltenham College and Magdalen College, Oxford, where one of his professors was C. S. Lewis. At Oxford, he befriended Penelope Houston and filmmakers Karel Reisz and Lindsay Anderson, and they founded a short-lived but influential journal, Sequence, which was originally edited by Houston. The magazine, which lasted for only 15 issues, moved to London after the fifth issue, and Lambert and Anderson took over as co-editors. Lambert eventually left Oxford without obtaining a degree. From 1949 to 1956 he edited the journal Sight and Sound, again with Anderson as a regular contributor. At about the same time Lambert was deeply involved in Britain's Free Cinema movement which called for more social realism in contemporary movies. He also wrote film criticism for The Sunday Times and The Guardian. In late 1955, he moved to Hollywood, California, to work as a personal assistant to director Nicholas Ray and worked on the script (uncredited) for Ray's Bigger Than Life (1956). Later, he co-wrote the screenplay for Ray's film Bitter Victory (1957). According to the critic David Robinson, Lambert was Ray's lover for a time.

Gavin Lambert became an American citizen in 1964. From 1974 to 1989, he chiefly stayed in Tangier, where he was a close friend of the writer and composer Paul Bowles. He spent the final years of his life in Los Angeles, where he died of pulmonary fibrosis on 17 July 2005. He left behind a brother, niece and nephew, and named Mart Crowley executor of his estate.

Gavin's father's half-sister was Ivy Claudine Godber aka Claudine West (1890-1943), a screenwriter who won an Oscar for her joint writing of the script of Mrs. Miniver in 1942.

His papers are currently housed at the Howard Gotlieb Archival Research Center at Boston University.

Writing achievements

Screenplays 
Lambert became a notable screenwriter of the Hollywood studio era. In 1954, while still living in England, he wrote his first screenplay, Another Sky, about the sexual awakening of a prim English woman in North Africa. In 1955, he also directed Another Sky in Morocco. This was followed in 1958 by the Hollywood screenplay, Bitter Victory and in 1960 by Sons and Lovers. The latter, for which Lambert gained an Academy Award nomination, is based on a novel by D. H. Lawrence. The Roman Spring of Mrs. Stone (1961) adapted a novella by Tennessee Williams on the affairs of an older actress with a young Italian gigolo. As, from the 1920s through the late 1960s, homosexuality was rarely portrayed on the screen, gay screenwriters like Lambert learned to express their personal sensibilities discreetly between the lines of a film. "The important thing to remember about 'gay influence' in movies," observed Gavin Lambert, "is that it was obviously never direct. It was all subliminal. It couldn't be direct because the mass audience would say, Hey, no way."

But then, in 1965, Lambert adapted his own Hollywood insider novel Inside Daisy Clover (1963) for the screen. Clover, starring Natalie Wood and Robert Redford, which tells the cautionary tale of a teenage movie star involved in the Hollywood studio system of the 1930s and her unhappy marriage to a closeted gay leading man. However, in the film version, he was not fully identified as gay because, at Redford's request, the husband he played was changed from homosexual to appear as though he might be bisexual. From this time on, Lambert and Wood became lifelong friends. Another of Lambert's screenplays was I Never Promised You a Rose Garden (1977), based on a novel by Hannah Green, which describes in layman's terms a teenager's battle with schizophrenia. Later, the author also wrote the scripts for some TV movies such as Second Serve (1986) on transgender tennis player Renée Richards and Liberace: Behind the Music (1988) on gay performer Liberace. In 1997, he contributed to Stephen Frears's film A Personal History of British Cinema. He was heavily quoted in William J. Mann's book, Behind the Screen: How Gays and Lesbians Shaped Hollywood, 1910-1969.

Biographies and non-fiction
Lambert was also a biographer and novelist, who focused his efforts on biographies of gay and lesbian figures in Hollywood.

According to screenwriter and writer Joseph McBride, he was "a keenly observant, wryly witty chronicler of Hollywood's social mores and artistic achievements." He wrote biographies on Hollywood figures such as On Cukor (1972) on film director George Cukor and Norma Shearer: A Life (1990) on the Canadian actress Norma Shearer. His book, Nazimova: A Biography (1997) was the first full-scale account of the private life and acting career of lesbian actress Alla Nazimova. He was the author of the memoir Mainly About Lindsay Anderson (2000) (whose title echoed that of Anderson's own work, About John Ford).

He also wrote the book GWTW: The Making of Gone with the Wind (Little, Brown and Company, 1973). Working as a Hollywood screenwriter, Lambert was able to interview and gain personal remembrances of most of the cast and crew involved with the film, including dismissed director George Cukor and star Vivien Leigh (Scarlett O'Hara).

His final biography, Natalie Wood: A Life (2004) supplied an insider's look at actress Natalie Wood and chronicled everything concerning her life, since Lambert was a friend of Wood for sixteen years. The book was praised by Natalie Wood's daughter, Natasha Gregson Wagner, as "a wonderful biography on my Mom. It will be the definitive biography on my mother." Lambert's biography includes Wood's relationship with Elvis Presley, and interviews with the people who knew Wood best, such as Robert Wagner, Warren Beatty, Tony Curtis, Paul Mazursky, Tab Hunter and Leslie Caron. In his book, Lambert controversially claimed that Wood frequently dated gay and bisexual men, including director Nicholas Ray and actors Nick Adams, Raymond Burr, James Dean, Tab Hunter, and Scott Marlowe. Lambert said that Wood supported homosexual playwright Mart Crowley (a later lover of Lambert's) in a manner that made it possible for him to write his play, The Boys in the Band (1968). Lambert's final book was The Ivan Moffat File: Life Among the Beautiful and Damned in London, Paris, New York and Hollywood (2004).

Novels and short stories

Lambert also wrote seven novels primarily with Hollywood settings, among them The Slide Area: Scenes of Hollywood Life (1959), a collection of seven short stories that portray a bevy of tinsel-town lowlifes, Inside Daisy Clover (1963), The Goodbye People (1971) about Hollywood's beautiful people, and Running Time (1982), a portrait of an indefatigable woman from child starlet to screen goddess, but also a unique life history of the American film industry. 
Other works of fiction included Norman's Letter (1966), which received the Thomas R. Coward Memorial Award for Fiction, A Case for the Angels (1968), and In the Night All Cats Are Grey (1976).
In 1996, Lambert wrote the introduction to 3 Plays, a collection of works by his longtime friend, Mart Crowley.

References

Further reading

External links 
 Advocate obituary 20 July 2005
 David Thomson, "Mainly about Gavin"
 'My Friend Paul Bowles' by Gavin Lambert
 Recent photo 
 Gavin Lambert's only directorial effort "Another Sky"

1924 births
2005 deaths
20th-century biographers
20th-century English novelists
Alumni of Magdalen College, Oxford
British film historians
Deaths from pulmonary fibrosis
English biographers
English male novelists
English male screenwriters
English gay writers
English LGBT novelists
British LGBT screenwriters
People educated at Cheltenham College
20th-century English male writers
English male non-fiction writers
20th-century English screenwriters
Male biographers
British expatriates in the United States
20th-century LGBT people